The Farewell Tour is the third live music video title by singer-actress Cher. Released by Warner Music Video in 2003, it contained a live date from Living Proof: The Farewell Tour, filmed at American Airlines Arena in Miami on November 8, 2002. It was originally aired on April 8, 2003 as a television special on American network NBC attracting near 17 million viewers. Cher was awarded with an Emmy for Outstanding Variety, Music or Comedy Special. The same performance is also available on CD format as Live! The Farewell Tour. The video was a big success in many countries and has received several certification awards: 3× Platinum in the US, 8× Platinum in Australia and Platinum in the UK, among others respectively.

Formats
CD — CD case edition packed with the live CD.
DVD — DVD Digipack and Amaray Case in some countries packed with the DVD.

Track listing

Production credits
Director: David Mallet
Producers: Dione Orrom and Paul Morphos
Executive Producers: Cher, Roger Davies and Lindsay Scott
Executive Producer for Serpent Film: Rocky Oldham
Tour Directed: Doriana Sanchez
Choreography: Doriana Sanchez and Bubba Carr

Certifications and sales

!scope="row"|New Zealand Music Videos (RMNZ)
|align="left"|Platinum
|align="left"|5,000
|-
!scope="row"|Portugal (AFP)
|align="left"|Silver
|align="left"|2,000
|-
!scope="row"|Swedish DVD (Sverigetopplistan)
|align="left"|Gold
|align="left"|10,000
|-

See also
 Live! The Farewell Tour
 Living Proof: The Farewell Tour

External links

Rovi review

References

Cher video albums
2003 video albums
2003 live albums
Live video albums
Films directed by David Mallet (director)
NBC television specials
2003 television specials
2000s American television specials